The Ministry of Foreign Affairs is the Algerian government ministry which oversees the foreign relations of Algeria. Its head office is in El Mouradia, Algiers Province.

Ramtane Lamamra has served as Minister of Foreign Affairs since July 2021.

List of Ministers

See also

 Foreign relations of Algeria

References

External links
 Ministry of Foreign Affairs

Foreign Affairs
Foreign relations of Algeria
Algeria